Jacob Hubert Reed (born September 29, 1992) is an American professional baseball pitcher in the Los Angeles Dodgers organization. He previously played in Major League Baseball (MLB) for the Dodgers, New York Mets, and Baltimore Orioles. He played college baseball for the Oregon Ducks.

Career

Amateur career
Reed attended Helix High School in La Mesa, California, where he played for the school's baseball team as a pitcher and the American football team as a quarterback. For the baseball team as a sophomore, Reed had a 5–4 win–loss record with a 1.54 earned run average (ERA) and 70 strikeouts in  innings pitched, winning the Grossmont South League Pitcher of the Year. After graduating in 2011, the Chicago White Sox selected Reed in the 40th round, with the 1,221st overall selection, of the 2011 MLB Draft. He did not sign with the White Sox, opting instead to attend college.

Reed enrolled at the University of Oregon to play college baseball for the Oregon Ducks baseball team. As a freshman, Reed set a Ducks' record for innings pitched by a freshman in a season. In his junior year at Oregon, the Ducks transitioned Reed into a relief pitcher. Serving as the Ducks' closer, Reed had a 4–1 win–loss record, a 1.93 ERA, and 13 saves. He was named to the All-Pac-12 Conference's first team.

Minnesota Twins
The Minnesota Twins selected Reed in the fifth round, with the 140th overall selection, in the 2014 MLB Draft. He signed with the Twins, receiving a $350,000 signing bonus.

Reed began the 2014 season with the Elizabethton Twins of the Rookie-level Appalachian League, and was promoted to the Cedar Rapids Kernels of the Class A Midwest League during the season. He finished the 2014 season with a 3–0 win–loss record, an 0.30 ERA, seven saves, and 39 strikeouts to three walks and 11 hits allowed in 30 innings pitched between the two levels. After the 2014 regular season, the Twins assigned Reed to the Arizona Fall League (AFL). In week one of the AFL season, he was named the Pitcher of the Week.

The Twins assigned Reed to the Chattanooga Lookouts of the Class AA Southern League to start the 2015 season, but he struggled, and was demoted to the Fort Myers Miracle of the Class A-Advanced Florida State League. He returned to the Arizona Fall League after the season. The next year, Reed returned to Chattanooga and the Rochester Red Wings of the Class AAA International League. In 2017, Reed again pitched for Rochester and Chattanooga, recording a 2.13 ERA in 27 games. Reed spent the 2018 season in Rochester, recording a stellar 1.89 ERA in 30 appearances. He remained in Rochester for the 2019 season, pitching to a 5–3 record and 5.76 ERA in 45 games. Reed did not play in a game in 2020 due to the cancellation of the minor league season because of the COVID-19 pandemic.

Los Angeles Angels
On November 17, 2020, Reed signed a minor league deal with the Los Angeles Angels organization. He was assigned to the Triple-A Salt Lake Bees to begin the 2021 season. After pitching to an 8.44 ERA in eight appearances, Reed opted out of his contract on May 31, 2021.

Los Angeles Dodgers
On June 4, 2021, Reed signed a minor league contract with the Los Angeles Dodgers and was assigned to Triple-A Oklahoma City Dodgers. In nine games with the team, he recorded a 2.61 ERA with 11 strikeouts. On July 6, the Dodgers added Reed to the 40-man roster and promoted him to the majors for the first time. He made his debut that night against the Miami Marlins, pitching  of an inning, allowing two hits, an intentional walk and one run while striking out Garrett Cooper for his first MLB strikeout.  He pitched  innings across six games for the Dodgers while allowing three runs (two earned)  on five hits. He was designated for assignment on July 21.

Tampa Bay Rays
On July 25, 2021, the Tampa Bay Rays claimed Reed off waivers from the Dodgers. He was designated for assignment on July 30, 2021.

New York Mets
On August 2, 2021, Reed was claimed off of waivers by the New York Mets. He was designated for assignment on July 10, 2022.

Los Angeles Dodgers (second stint)
On July 13, 2022, Reed was claimed off waivers by the Dodgers. He picked up his first career save on August 30 against the Mets. He was designated for assignment on September 2. In five games for the Dodgers, he allowed one run in  innings.

Baltimore Orioles
Reed was claimed off waivers by the Baltimore Orioles on September 5, 2022. He had a 1–0 record with a 6.35 ERA while allowing four earned runs and seven hits in  innings over eight relief appearances with the Orioles before being designated for assignment on October 12.

Los Angeles Dodgers (third stint)
Reed was claimed off waivers by the Boston Red Sox on October 13, 2022. On November 15, he was designated for assignment. Reed was again claimed off waivers by the Dodgers on November 18, 2022. The Dodgers designated him for assignment on December 29. He cleared waivers and was outrighted to the minors on January 5, 2023.

Personal life
Reed is married to Janie Takeda-Reed, a softball outfielder for the United States women's national softball team which won a silver medal at the 2020 Summer Olympics.

References

External links

1992 births
Living people
People from La Mesa, California
Baseball players from California
Major League Baseball pitchers
Los Angeles Dodgers players
New York Mets players
Baltimore Orioles players
Oregon Ducks baseball players
Elizabethton Twins players
Cedar Rapids Kernels players
Salt River Rafters players
Chattanooga Lookouts players
Fort Myers Miracle players
Rochester Red Wings players
Scottsdale Scorpions players
Salt Lake Bees players
Oklahoma City Dodgers players
Durham Bulls players
Syracuse Mets players